Mount Eden is an unincorporated community in Spencer County, Kentucky, United States.

References

Unincorporated communities in Spencer County, Kentucky
Unincorporated communities in Kentucky